Martin Ullmann (born 11 December 1986 in Erfurt) is a German retired footballer who played as an attacker. He played in the 3. Liga for Carl Zeiss Jena.

References
Profile at FC Carl Zeiss Jena

1986 births
Living people
German footballers
FC Carl Zeiss Jena players
FC Rot-Weiß Erfurt players
Sportspeople from Erfurt
3. Liga players
FSV Zwickau players
Association football forwards
Footballers from Thuringia